The Impeccable-class ocean surveillance ship is a single-ship class of United States Navy special mission-support ship. The original intention was to build six undersea ocean-surveillance ships carrying a SURTASS passive towed array and a Low Frequency Active transducer array.  Only the lead ship, was built.

History
The keel was laid on March 15, 1992. However, before the ship was completed, Tampa Shipyards went bankrupt, and construction of the rest of the ship class was cancelled. The Chief of Naval Operations for the United States Navy asserted the requirement to finish the initial ship. The incomplete hull was towed to Gulfport, Mississippi in 1995, where it was completed by Halter Marine Inc. Impeccable was officially launched on November 1, 2000.

However, the contract was never awarded,. and the other four ships were never named.

Similar ship classes
Both classes are SWATH type ships.

The Stalwart class is not a SWATH hull, but a modified oceangoing tug.

References

Small waterplane area twin hull vessels
 
Auxiliary surveillance ship classes